Wollega University (WU), also known as Nekemte University, is a university in Nekemte, a town in the Western Oromia Region of Ethiopia.

Description 
WU started out with 1600 students. According to the UCBP, it currently has 4,048 pupils. Wollega is found in western part of Oromia. The institution features 32 departments, with additional facilities planned. Wollega University also provides medical laboratory science training. After renovations, the institution is expected to accommodate 12,000 students. 

At present, Wollega University runs 82 undergraduate, 45 graduate programs and 5 PhD programs in the three campuses.

Undergraduate programs 
College of Engineering and Technology
Collage of Natural and Computational Science
College of Health and Medical Science
College of Agriculture and Natural Resource
College of Social Science and Education
College of Social Science and Humanities
College of Business and Economics

Postgraduate programs 

 Master of Business Administration (MBA)
 Public Administration (MA in PA & MPA)
 Agricultural Economics (MSc in Agricultural  EC)
 Development Economics
 MBA in Banking & Finance
 Oromo Language & Literature (MA in OLL)
 Teaching English as a Foreign Language (MA in TEFL)
 Plant Breeding (Master of Science in Plant Breeding)
 Nutrition and Food Science (MSc in NFS)
 Sugarcane Agronomy (MSc in Sugarcane agronomy)
 Political Science (MA in Political Science)
 Master of Public Health/General
 Master of Public Health/Reproductive Health
 Master of Public Health/Microbiology
 Physics/ Master of Science in Physics
 Accounting
 Medical Anthropology
Masters of public health in psychiatry
Masters of Advanced Architectural Design

Campuses
Currently Wollega University has three campuses: Wollega University Nekemte Campus (Main Campus) located in East Wollega Zone, Gimbi Campus (College of Social Sciences, Natural & Environmental Sciences) located in West Wollega Zone, and Shambu Campus (College of Agricultural Sciences) located in Horo Guduru Welega Zone. From these respective campuses on 29 June 2013, 2492 students with various field of studies both in 1st and 2nd degree have graduated.

Science, Technology and Arts Research Journal
STAR Journal is an official international journal of Wollega University.

Notes

External links
Wollega University Official Website

Educational institutions established in 2007
2007 establishments in Ethiopia
Universities and colleges in Oromia Region